Meloidogyne acronea, the African cotton root-knot nematode or African cotton root nematode, is a plant pathogenic nematode affecting pigeonpeas. It is also an invasive species.  The roots and surrounding soils of cereals, grasses, and Gossypium spp. provide habitat for this organism. M. acronea was confirmed as a potentially problematic pest of cotton, Gossypium hirsutum cv. Makoka, which was proven through pot experiments.

See also 
 List of pigeonpea diseases

References

Sources 
Coetzee, V. Meloidogyne acronea, a new species of root-knot nematode. Nature. 1956 May 12;177(4515):899-900.
Page, SLJ., & Bridge, J. (1994). The African Cotton-Root Nematode, Meloidogyne-Acronea - Its Pathogenicity and Intra-Generic Infectivity within Gossypium. Fundamental and Applied Nematology, 17(1), 67–73.

External links 
 Nemaplex, University of California - Meloidogyne acronea
  American Society of Nematologists - Meloidogyne acronea

Tylenchida
Agricultural pest nematodes
Pulse crop diseases
Nematodes described in 1956